Oluf Kristian Edvin Pedersen (14 March 1878 – 8 March 1917) was a Danish gymnast who competed in the 1906 Intercalated Games and in the 1912 Summer Olympics.

At the 1906 Games in Athens, he was a member of the Danish gymnastics team, which won the silver medal. Six years later he won the bronze medal in the gymnastics men's team, free system event.

References

External links 
 
 

1878 births
1917 deaths
Danish male artistic gymnasts
Olympic gymnasts of Denmark
Olympic silver medalists for Denmark
Olympic bronze medalists for Denmark
Olympic medalists in gymnastics
Medalists at the 1906 Intercalated Games
Medalists at the 1912 Summer Olympics
Gymnasts at the 1906 Intercalated Games
Gymnasts at the 1912 Summer Olympics